"Walk Away" is a song by American heavy metal band Five Finger Death Punch. The song was released as the second single from their second album, War Is the Answer, and their fifth single overall on November 2, 2009. The song peaked at number seven on the Billboard Hot Mainstream Rock Tracks chart (the band's fourth top-10 on that chart), number 31 on the Alternative Songs chart and number 21 on the Rock Songs chart (their second appearance in the latter charts), making it their second highest-charted single to date. It was a free downloadable track in the iPhone game application, Tap Tap Revenge 3. It was also used as the official theme song for the 2010 TNA Lockdown PPV.

Writing
About the conception of the song, guitarist Zoltan Bathory told Metal Hammer, "You know, it's rare to come up with a song that is so complete, and I don't say that with any sense of ego. As far as I'm concerned, I'm not really the writer of the song, I'm just the vehicle for the music, but I'm really delighted to have channelled something like this – a number with the potential to touch people's lives in a powerful way, and that's an ancient and a primal thing, and actually quite a tough thing to do…"

He further added, "I think the song is pretty forceful from just a musical point of view, but when you add in the vocals and the lyrics, it takes things to a whole new plane. Ivan is dealing with relationship issues in the lyrics, and he's certainly loaded with ammo on that subject, you can tell he's singing straight from the heart… Sometimes in life, the stars all align and a bit of magic is created, and I certainly think that's the case here…"

Track listing

Chart performance

Personnel
Ivan Moody – vocals
Jason Hook – guitars, backing vocals 
Zoltan Bathory – guitars 
Matt Snell – bass
Jeremy Spencer – drums

References

Songs about parting
2009 singles
Five Finger Death Punch songs
2009 songs
Song recordings produced by Kevin Churko
Songs written by Zoltan Bathory
Songs written by Ivan Moody (vocalist)
Songs written by Jason Hook
Songs written by Jeremy Spencer (drummer)
American hard rock songs